Cynisca gansi is a species of worm lizard in the family Amphisbaenidae. The species is endemic to Nigeria.

Etymology
The specific name, gansi, is in honor of American herpetologist Carl Gans.

Geographic range
C. gansi is found in Kwara State, Nigeria.

Habitat
The preferred habitat of C. gansi is forest.

Reproduction
C. gansi is oviparous.

References

Further reading
Dunger GT (1968). "The lizards and snakes of Nigeria. Part 5: the amphisbaenids of Nigeria including a description of 3 new species". Nigerian Field 33 (4): 167–192. (Cynisca gansi, new species).
Gans C (2005). "Checklist and Bibliography of the Amphisbaenia of the World". Bulletin of the American Museum of Natural History (289): 1–130. (Cynisca gansi, p. 28).

Cynisca (lizard)
Reptiles described in 1968
Taxa named by Gerald T. Dunger
Endemic fauna of Nigeria
Reptiles of Nigeria